ITR may refer to
 Income tax return (India)
 Indiana Toll Road
 International Tax Review (ITR)
 Inverted terminal repeat (molecular biology)
 i-Tree Tools software suite from the .itr file extension
 Ittar, a type of perfume